The Whitesand River is a river in Thunder Bay District, Ontario, Canada, that flows south into the northwest side of Lake Nipigon.

Course
Selassie Lake is adjacent to Haile Lake, which also flows into Lake Nipigon, but via the Pikitigushi River system. The names of the two lakes are a reference to Haile Selassie I of Ethiopia.

See also
List of rivers of Ontario

References

Rivers of Thunder Bay District